Debre Mariam is a monastery in Qohayn Eritrea, founded by Abba Absadi, a disciple of the monk Ewostatewos between 1340-1350. The monastery is located at the confluence of the Obel and Gash Rivers. Since its founding the monastery acquired an extravagant manuscript library. Debre Mariam was the preeminent monastery in Eritrea until Debre Bizen surpassed it.

References

See also
 List of Eritrean Orthodox monasteries

Christian monasteries established in the 14th century
Eritrean Orthodox monasteries
Oriental Orthodox monasteries in Eritrea